Rector School District is a public school district based in Rector, Arkansas, United States. The school district encompasses  of land, including portions of Clay County and Greene County serving the communities of Rector and Greenway.

The Rector School District was previously known as the Clay County Central School District from its founding in 1984 until 2000.

The district proves comprehensive education for more than 600 pre-kindergarten through grade 12 students and is accredited by the Arkansas Department of Education (ADE).

History
It was established by the merger of the Greenway School District and the former Rector School District on July 1, 1984.

Schools 
 Rector High School, located in Rector and serving more than 250 students in grades 7 through 12.
 Rector Elementary School, located in Rector and serving more than 350 students in pre-kindergarten through grade 6.

References

Further reading
 (Download) - Includes maps of predecessor districts

External links 
 
  

School districts in Arkansas
Education in Clay County, Arkansas
Education in Greene County, Arkansas
1984 establishments in Arkansas
School districts established in 1984